Scapin the Schemer is a three-act comedy of intrigue by the French playwright Molière. The title character Scapin is similar to the archetypical Scapino character. The play was first staged on 24 May 1671 in the theatre of the Palais-Royal in Paris.

The original play is in French but, like many of Molière's plays, it has been translated into many different languages. Adaptations in English include the 1676 The Cheats of Scapin by Thomas Otway and Scapino by Frank Dunlop and Jim Dale in 1974,<ref>[http://www.dramaticpublishing.com/p1319/Scapino!/product_info.html Scapino!]</ref> which has also been further adapted by Noyce Burleson. Bill Irwin and Mark O'Donnell also adapted the play, as Scapin, in 1995.
 Characters 
 Scapin  Léandre's valet and "fourbe" (a rough translation of "fourbe" is "a deceitful person")
 Léandre  Son of Géronte and lover of Zerbinette
 Octave  Son of Argante and lover of Hyacinthe
 Géronte  Father of Léandre and of Hyacinthe
 Argante  Father of Octave and of Zerbinette
 Hyacinthe  Daughter of Géronte and lover of Octave
 Zerbinette  Daughter of Argante and lover of Léandre, believed to be a gypsy girl
 Silvestre  Octave's valet
 Carle  "Fourbe"
 Nérine  Hyacinthe's wet nurse
 Two porters

 Plot 
Scapin constantly lies and tricks people to get ahead. He is an arrogant, pompous man who acts as if nothing were impossible for him. However, he is also a diplomatic genius. He manages to play the other characters off of each other very easily, and yet manages to keep his overall goal — to help the young couples — in sight.

In their fathers' absence, Octave has secretly married Hyacinthe and Léandre has secretly fallen in love with Zerbinette. But the fathers return from a trip with marriage plans for their respective sons. Scapin, after hearing many pleas for help, comes to their rescue. Thanks to many tricks and lies, Scapin manages to come up with enough money from the parents to make sure that the young couples get to stay married. But, no one knows who Hyacinthe and Zerbinette really are. It ends in the classic "And they lived happily ever after," and Scapin is even brought to the head of the table at the ending feast (even though he has to fake a fatal wound to make it happen ).

 Quotations 

See also
Scapino

Notes

 Garreau, Joseph E. 1984. "Molière". In McGraw-Hill Encyclopedia of World Drama. Ed. Stanley Hochman. New York: McGraw-Hill. . 397–418.
 Pavis, Patrice. 1998. Dictionary of the Theatre: Terms, Concepts, and Analysis.'' Trans. Christine Shantz. Toronto and Buffalo: U of Toronto P. .

Bibliography
Comédie Française - Histoire de la Comédie Française 
Les Fourberies de Scapin 
Scapin, adapted by Bill Irwin and Mark O'Donnell

External links

  of the Charles Heron Wall-Translation
 "Our Man Scapin"  Free Online 2012 American Translation

1671 plays
Comedy plays
Plays by Molière
Satirical plays
French plays adapted into films